Royal Air Force Poulton or more simply RAF Poulton (X4PL) is a former Royal Air Force satellite station located near Poulton, Cheshire and was operational from 1 March 1943 until 1945. It was used as an Operational Training Unit (OTU) and Tactical Exercise Unit (TEU) for Hawker Hurricanes.

History
It was part of 12 Group and was used as a satellite of RAF Hawarden. It had 8 Blister and 1 Bessonneau hangars.

Based units and aircraft
 No. 3 Tactical Exercise Unit RAF (TEU), using the Hawker Hurricane. Arrived Nov 43. Possibly moved to Aston Down on 18 Dec 44 and re-designated as No 55 OTU.
 No. 12 (Pilots) Advanced Flying Unit RAF ((P) AFU), using the Airspeed Oxford.
 No. 1515 (Beam Approach Training) Flight RAF, almost certainly using the Airspeed Oxford.
 No. 41 Operational Training Unit RAF (OTU) (Day Fighter Wing), possibly using the Hawker Hurricane. Moved to Poulton from Hawarden 1 Feb 45, and was re-designated as...
 No. 58 OTU on 15 Mar 45, using the Supermarine Spitfire. Disbanded 20 Jul 45.
 Detachment from No. 595 Squadron RAF

Current use
Part of the site remains in use as a private airfield.

References

Citations

Bibliography

External links
RAF Poulton (at Airfields of Britain Conservation Trust)

Royal Air Force stations in Cheshire